Dandong Tengyue Football Club is a professional Chinese football club that currently participates in the China League Two. The team is based in Dandong, Liaoning.

History
Dandong Hantong F.C. was founded in 1999. The club participated in Chinese Champions League in 2020 and was promoted to China League Two. In 2021, the club changed its name to Dandong Tengyue F.C.

Name history
1999–2020 Dandong Hantong F.C. 丹东瀚通
2021– Dandong Tengyue F.C. 丹东腾跃

Players

Current squad

References

External links
Soccerway

Dandong Tengyue F.C.
Football clubs in China
Association football clubs established in 1999
1999 establishments in China